Happy Valley is a town located in the Local Government Area of the Rural City of Swan Hill. It shares the same name with Happy Valley in Western Victoria.

References

Towns in Victoria (Australia)
Rural City of Swan Hill